Gomendra Multiple College was started at Birtamode 4, Jhapa, Nepal to provide quality education with the motto of "Study Locally, Qualify Globally" at minimum cost in remote place in the field of IT. Established in the year 2053BS(1996)'it is continuously providing quality assistance for students in the field of education for more than 25 years.

Mission
The college's mission is to provide quality education in the field of Information technology and develop into a model college.

Description
The college offer the course of following:
Bachelor of Computer Application(BCA)
Bachelor of Business Administration(BBA)

See also

 Education in Nepal
 List of schools in Nepal

References

Universities and colleges in Nepal